Vesselin Stoykov (born 1 November 1973 in Stara Zagora) is a Bulgarian-German opera singer and manager, from Bulgarian origin.

Education 
 New Bulgarian University – Doctor of Philosophy (Music sciences);
 New Bulgarian University – Master of Arts (Science of Vocal education);
 Music Academy Detmold Germany – Postgraduate studies;
 National Music Academy Sofia Bulgaria – Bachelor of Arts (Classical singing)
 Music High School Stara Zagora – Graduation as Violin player

Stoykov's stage debut is in 1995 in the State Opera of Stara Zagora, playing Don Basilio in The Barber of Seville.  Later, he performed as a solo singer in various opera and concert halls worldwide: Teatro Carlo Felice, Italy; National Opera Guatemala City; National Opera San Jose, Costa Rica; State Opera Cologne Germany; Staatsoper Hannover; Frankfurt Opera; Teatro Campoamor Oviedo, Spain, Concertgebow Amsterdam, Osaka Philharmony Hall, Detmold, Görlitz, Gießen, Hanover, Bremen, Heidelberg, State Opera Schwerin, Germany, City Opera Bremerhaven, Germany, Sumida Toriphony Hall Tokyo, Japan and many others.

He has been the general manager and artistic director of the State Opera in Stara Zagora, Bulgaria, since 2007.

Awards 
Premio internazionale citta`di Sofia 2007 (Award for cultural merits from the Region Umbria Italy)
Golden Book 2010 (Award for cultural earnings as general manager and artistic director of State Opera Stara Zagora)

External links 
 
 Dr. Vesselin Stoykov
 Bulgarian businessperson of the year

Sources 

1973 births
Living people
21st-century German male opera singers
Musicians from Stara Zagora
Bulgarian emigrants to Germany
21st-century Bulgarian singers